North Mahanoy Creek is a tributary of Mahanoy Creek in Schuylkill County, Pennsylvania, in the United States. The creek is designated as an impaired waterbody due to sedimentation/siltation and water/flow variation from abandoned mine drainage. The creek is relatively small, an ephemeral stream in its lower reaches, and is located within the Western Middle Anthracite Field.

The watershed of North Mahanoy Creek is in the upper part of the Mahanoy Creek drainage basin. It is one of the major tributaries of Mahanoy Creek. A number of bridge have been constructed over North Mahanoy Creek. The creek's watershed is designated as a Coldwater Fishery and a Migratory Fishery. It has a few macroinvertebrate taxa, but no fish. However, wild trout naturally reproduce in two of its unnamed tributaries.

Course
North Mahanoy Creek begins on Bear Head in Delano Township. It flows southwest for a few tenths of a mile before turning south and flowing along the border of the census-designated place of Delano. The creek then enters a valley and turns west-southwest for a few miles, almost immediately entering Mahanoy Township. Further downstream, it receives three unnamed tributaries from the right. The creek then turns southwest for several tenths of a mile, receiving another unnamed tributary from the right before turning south and then south-southeast. It then turns southwest for several tenths of a mile, entering Mahanoy City and reaching its confluence with Mahanoy Creek.

Tributaries
North Mahanoy Creek has no named tributaries. However, it does have a number of unnamed tributaries. Two of these are known unofficially as "Pole Run" and "Cold Run".

Hydrology
North Mahanoy Creek is designated as an impaired waterbody. The causes of impairment are sedimentation/siltation and water/flow variation and the likely source of impairment is abandoned mine drainage. The creek loses most or all of its flow to underground mines. The lower reaches of the creek are ephemeral due to this flow loss.

In late March 2001, the water temperature of the creek was measured to be .

The concentration of carbon dioxide was measured to be .

Geography and geology
The creek is a relatively small stream, being approximately a few feet wide in the late 1800s.

North Mahanoy Creek is situated entirely within the Western Middle Anthracite Field, where coal was extensively mined between 1840 and 1950. There are relatively large silt piles in the vicinity of the creek. The landscape in the creek's vicinity is scarred by past mining operations, but there are no large abandoned mine drainage discharges in its watershed. There are still mining operations and abandoned mine lands in the watershed.

The headwaters of North Mahanoy Creek are in unpolluted springs and surface runoff near Locust Mountain. However, strip mining has caused significant disruption to the watershed. A coal basin known as the North Mahanoy Basin is in the vicinity of the creek.

Watershed
The mouth of the creek is in the United States Geological Survey quadrangle of Shenandoah. However, its source is in the quadrangle of Delano. The creek is one of the major tributaries of Mahanoy Creek.

The designated use of North Mahanoy Creek is aquatic life. The creek's watershed is in the uppermost part of the Mahanoy Creek drainage basin.

There are a number of lakes and/or ponds in the watershed of North Mahanoy Creek.

History
North Mahanoy Creek was entered into the Geographic Names Information System on August 2, 1979. Its identifier in the Geographic Names Information System is 1193047.

It was alleged during a case in the late 1800s that waste from a nearby gas works was being discharged into the creek. In the early 1900s, numerous private sewers discharged into North Mahanoy Creek.

Biology
The drainage basin of North Mahanoy Creek is designated as a Coldwater Fishery and a Migratory Fishery. In 2001, no fish were observed in at the mouth of the creek. However, macroinvertebrates were observed there. Wild trout naturally reproduce in two unnamed tributaries of the creek.

In 2001, a total of five macroinvertebrate taxa were observed on North Mahanoy Creek. The taxa Chironomidae and  Simuliidae were classified as "common", with 10 to 24 individuals being observed. The taxa Limnephilidae and Rhyacophilidae were classified as "present", with 3 to 9 individuals being observed. Oligochaeta was classified as "rare", with only one or two individuals being observed.

In 2001, the family-level Hilsenhoff Biotic Index value of North Mahanoy Creek at its mouth was 5.24.

See also
Shenandoah Creek, next tributary of Mahanoy Creek going downstream
List of rivers of Pennsylvania
List of tributaries of Mahanoy Creek

References

External links
USGS 0155521049 North Mahanoy Creek at Mahanoy City, PA

Rivers of Schuylkill County, Pennsylvania
Tributaries of Mahanoy Creek
Rivers of Pennsylvania